Pharmacy is a surface light rail transit (LRT) stop under construction on Line 5 Eglinton, a new line that is part of the Toronto subway system in Ontario, Canada. It will be located in the Golden Mile neighbourhood at the intersection of Eglinton Avenue East and Pharmacy Avenue. It is scheduled to open in 2023.

The stop is located in the middle of Eglinton Avenue on the east side of its intersection with Pharmacy Avenue and has parallel side platforms which will be accessed from the pedestrian crossing on the east side of the signalized street intersection. Between this stop and the Hakimi Lebovic stop to the east, there are two separate crossovers, one trailing point and the other facing point.

History 

In March 2020, Pharmacy became the first stop on the surface section of the line to receive a passenger waiting shelter. The shelter was pre-fabricated and hoisted into position onto the LRT boarding platform.

Surface connections 

, the following are the proposed connecting routes that would serve this station when Line 5 Eglinton opens:

References

External links

Line 5 Eglinton stations